William Bolton may refer to:

William Bolton (priest), Dean of Ross, Ireland, 1630–1637
Sir William Bolton (died 1680), English merchant and Lord Mayor
William Bolton (naval officer, died 1817), Royal Navy Captain (served 1789–1809) 
William Bolton (naval officer, died 1830), Royal Navy Captain (served 1793–1815) 
William Compton Bolton, United States Navy officer (served 1806–d.1849)
William Jay Bolton (1816–1884), American designer of stained glass 
William Kinsey Bolton (1861–1941), commanding officer of the Australian 8th Battalion AIF during World War I for the landings at Gallipoli
William P. Bolton (1885–1964), U.S. Congressman from Maryland
William Bolton (footballer), English football winger (active 1915)
William Robert Fossey Bolton (1905–1973), businessman and philanthropist from Toowoomba, Australia
William Bolton (rugby union) (1815–1896), Scottish rugby union player